The 1920–21 Gold Cup was the 9th edition of the Gold Cup, a cup competition in Irish football.

The tournament was won by Linfield for the fourth time.

Group standings

References

1920–21 in Irish association football